In geometry, the Killing–Hopf theorem states that complete connected Riemannian manifolds of constant curvature are isometric to a quotient of a sphere, Euclidean space, or hyperbolic space by a group acting freely and properly discontinuously. These manifolds are called space forms.

References

 
 

Riemannian geometry
Theorems in Riemannian geometry